Hightown is a suburban area of Wrexham, in Wrexham County Borough, Wales. 

The Wrexham and Ellesmere Railway used to have a station known as Hightown Halt. The north-western parts of Hightown towards St Giles' Church near Salop Road were once a separate hamlet called Wrexham Fechan until it was eventually reabsorbed by the then growing town.

There is a military barracks called Hightown Barracks in the suburb. 

Until 2011, the suburb was home to the  "Hightown Flats", five blocks of five-storey flats built in 1970 of the Napier Square and Gatefield estates. The complex contained 181 flats and maisonettes, as well as five bungalows and 26 four bedroom houses. The flats were known for safety issues, such as poorly lit corridors, and vandalism such as graffiti and abandoned furniture. The area around the complex was associated with antisocial behaviour, arson, and theft. The complex was demolished by Wrexham County Borough Council in 2011 for re-generation, with locals supporting demolition as the only option to regenerate the area.

References 

Areas of Wrexham